Inígo Garcia is a paralympic athlete from Spain competing mainly in category F12 shot put and discus events.

Inigo has been a part of three Paralympic games since his first in 1996 Summer Paralympics in Atlanta.  In each of 1996 Summer Paralympics, 2000 and 2004 Summer Paralympics he has competed in the shot put and discus, his only medal came in the shot put in 2000 where he won a silver medal.

References

External links
 

Paralympic athletes of Spain
Athletes (track and field) at the 1996 Summer Paralympics
Athletes (track and field) at the 2000 Summer Paralympics
Athletes (track and field) at the 2004 Summer Paralympics
Paralympic silver medalists for Spain
Living people
Paralympic athletes with a vision impairment
Medalists at the 2000 Summer Paralympics
Year of birth missing (living people)
Paralympic medalists in athletics (track and field)
Spanish male shot putters
Visually impaired shot putters
Paralympic shot putters
Spanish blind people